The 3rd Annual Gotham Independent Film Awards, presented by the Independent Filmmaker Project, were held on September 28, 1993 and were hosted by Eric Bogosian. At the ceremony, Martin Scorsese was honored with a Career Tribute with Harvey Keitel, John Guare, Patrizia von Brandenstein and David Brown receiving the other individual awards.

Winners

Breakthrough Director (Open Palm Award)
 Leslie Harris – Just Another Girl on the I.R.T.

Actor Award
 Harvey Keitel

Writer Award
 John Guare

Below-the-Line Award
 Patrizia von Brandenstein, production designer

Producer/Industry Executive Award
 David Brown

Career Tribute
 Martin Scorsese

References

External links
 

1993
1993 film awards